Capoeta capoetoides is a cyprinid fish found in Africa. It is known only from the type specimen of doubtful origin and in poor condition, probably from the Chad Basin. As all other species of this genus are found in Asia, placement of this species in Capoeta is doubtful.

References 

capoetoides
Fish described in 1938